Hengtong is a Chinese power and fiber optic cable manufacturer. It is listed as the 7th largest manufacturer in market research firm Integer's 2017 Top 100 Global Wire & Cable Producers and the only Chinese cable manufacturer to make the ranking's top 10.

The company claimed the top spot with annual revenue growth of 46.5% from 2008 to 2012 in a report by the Association of Chartered Certified Accountants titled "China's Next 100 Global Giants", a ranking of Chinese businesses with the most global growth potential.

History
The company was founded in 1991 and in 2003 was listed on the Shanghai Stock Exchange.

Joint ventures
In 2010, the company formed Jiangsu OFS Hengtong Optical Technology Co., a joint venture with OFS, a US subsidiary of Furukawa Electric, to manufacture optical fiber preforms.

In 2012, the company announced a joint venture in Brazil with local cable manufacturer, Brascopper, to establish a manufacturing facility for fiber optic cable in Mato Grosso do Sul. Hentong will hold 51% of the JV, which was established to further the company's goal of expanding in Brazil and the rest of Latin America.

References

External links
Company promotional video

Chinese brands
Manufacturing companies based in Suzhou
Companies established in 1993
Companies listed on the Shanghai Stock Exchange
Wire and cable manufacturers